Thieves & Liars (2006–2010) was an American Christian rock and Christian metal band from San Diego, California, where they formed in 2006, and disbanded in 2010. The members of the band were vocalist and bassist, Joey Bradford, drummer and vocalist, Kyle Rosa, and lead guitarist, Corey Edelmann. Their first album, When Dreams Become Reality, was released in 2008 by Facedown Records alongside Dreamt Records. The subsequent album, American Rock 'N' Roll, was released by the aforementioned record labels, in 2009.

Background
Thieves & Liars was a Christian metal and Christian rock band, who comes from San Diego, California. Their members were vocalist and bassist, Joey Bradford, drummer and vocalist, Kyle Rosa, and lead guitarist, Corey Edelmann.

Music history
The band commenced as a musical entity in 2006, with their first release, When Dreams Become Reality, a studio album, that was released by Facedown Records in association with Dreamt Records, on January 22, 2008. Their subsequent and final album, American Rock 'N' Roll, was released on September 1, 2009, by the aforementioned record labels.

Members
Last Known Line-up
 Joey Bradford - vocals, bass
 Kyle Rosa - drums, vocals (Poison Headache)
 Corey Edelmann - guitar (ex-No Innocent Victim, ex-Project 86)

Discography
Studio albums
 When Dreams Become Reality (January 22, 2008, Facedown/Dreamt)
 American Rock 'N' Roll (September 1, 2009, Facedown/Dreamt)

References

External links
 Cross Rhythms artist profile

Musical groups from San Diego
2006 establishments in California
2010 disestablishments in California
Musical groups established in 2006
Musical groups disestablished in 2010
Facedown Records artists